Franklin Park is a census-designated place (CDP) in Broward County, Florida, United States. The population was 860 at the 2010 census.

Geography
Franklin Park is located at  (26.133404, -80.175808).

According to the United States Census Bureau, the CDP has a total area of 0.2 km (0.1 mi2), all land.

Demographics

At the 2000 census, there were 943 people, 308 households and 218 families residing in the CDP. The population density was 5,201.3/km (13,817.5/mi2). There were 322 housing units at an average density of 1,776.1/km (4,718.2/mi2). The racial makeup of the CDP was 0.64% White, 97.56% African American, 0.11% Native American, 0.32% from other races, and 1.38% from two or more races. Hispanic or Latino of any race were 1.27% of the population.

There were 308 households, of which 44.8% had children under the age of 18 living with them, 18.8% were married couples living together, 41.9% had a female householder with no husband present, and 28.9% were non-families. 20.1% of all households were made up of individuals, and 4.9% had someone living alone who was 65 years of age or older. The average household size was 3.06 and the average family size was 3.51.

Age distribution was 42.6% under the age of 18, 10.2% from 18 to 24, 29.6% from 25 to 44, 13.3% from 45 to 64, and 4.3% who were 65 years of age or older. The median age was 24 years. For every 100 females, there were 84.2 males. For every 100 females age 18 and over, there were 76.2 males.

The median household income was $23,311, and the median family income was $23,007. Males had a median income of $17,679 versus $16,641 for females. The per capita income for the CDP was $6,583. About 35.4% of families and 38.2% of the population were below the poverty line, including 46.3% of those under age 18 and none of those age 65 or over.

In 2000, English as a first language accounted for 97.37% of all residents, while Spanish was the mother tongue for 2.62% of the population.

References

Census-designated places in Broward County, Florida
Census-designated places in Florida